At the 1920 Summer Olympics, six fencing events (all for men) were contested.

Medal summary

Participating nations
A total of 149 fencers from 13 nations competed at the Antwerp Games:

Medal table

References

Notes
 
 

 
1920 Summer Olympics events
1920
1920 in fencing
International fencing competitions hosted by Belgium